The 2008 United States Senate election in Georgia took place on November 4, 2008. The run off election took place on December 2, 2008. Republican Senator Saxby Chambliss, first elected in 2002, sought re-election to his position as a United States Senator from Georgia. He was challenged by Democratic nominee Jim Martin and Libertarian nominee Allen Buckley. After a runoff election on December 2, Chambliss was elected.

The runoff was necessary as neither Chambliss nor Martin, the two major party candidates, had won a majority of the vote in the first round. Early voting hours were set by county, and started November 17 or November 18. Prior to the runoff, advanced polls were open from November 24 to the 26th. Since the election was a runoff, only those voters who registered in time for the general election could cast ballots. It was the second Senate runoff election to be held in Georgia since runoffs were first mandated in 1964, following a runoff in 1992.

As of 2022, this remains the only time in history that a Republican has won re-election to Georgia's Class 2 Senate seat.

Election dates 
The state party primaries were on July 15, 2008, with primary runoff elections on August 5, 2008. The general election was held on November 4, 2008 and the general election runoff will be held on December 2, 2008 because no candidate received the necessary fifty percent of the vote.

Republican primary

Candidates 
 Saxby Chambliss, incumbent U.S. Senator

Results

Democratic primary 
The general primary was held July 15, 2008.  A run-off between the top two Democratic contenders was held on August 5, in which Jim Martin defeated Vernon Jones.

Candidates 
 Jim Martin, former State Representative and nominee for Lieutenant Governor in 2006
 Vernon Jones, businessman, DeKalb County chief executive officer and former State Representative
 Dale Cardwell, TV journalist
 Rand Knight, businessman
 Josh Lanier, Vietnam War veteran and former aide to U.S. Senator Herman Talmadge

Polling

Initial results 
Results for the first round showed that since Vernon Jones did not win a majority of the vote, a runoff was held between him and Martin. Martin subsequently won the runoff.

Run off results

General election

Candidates

Democratic 
Jim Martin, a former State Representative, former State Human Resources Commissioner, Vietnam War veteran, and 2006 nominee for lieutenant governor, challenged Chambliss for his seat. He made his support for PeachCare and other social services a signature issue in the campaign.  He made his opposition to the Emergency Economic Stabilization Act of 2008 an issue in the run off.

Libertarian 
Allen Buckley - Attorney, Accountant, 2004 senate nominee, and 2006 nominee for lieutenant governor. He was eliminated in the general election, but his endorsement was sought by both the Martin and Chambliss campaigns.

Republican 
Sen. Saxby Chambliss running for re-election for the first time, is a member of the Republican Party. He was elected to the House of Representatives in 1994 and had only one serious election challenge while in the House. He maintained high ratings from conservative interest groups such as the National Rifle Association, and the National Right to Life Committee, and correspondingly low marks from liberal interest groups such as the NAACP and ACLU. He sponsored legislation while in the Senate to replace the income tax with a national sales tax.

Predictions

Polling

Chambliss vs. Martin

Chambliss vs. Jones (Hypothetical)

Results 
As no candidate reached a majority on November 4, a runoff election was held on December 2, which Chambliss won.

Runoff election

Candidates 
 Chambliss (R)
 Martin (D)

Campaign 

Both qualifying candidates' runoff campaigns began in earnest on November 10, when election returns made it clear that a runoff would be required.  With an election date of December 2, candidates were given only 3 weeks for additional campaigning.

The Libertarian nominee did not endorse either candidate in the run-off, though both campaigns reportedly inquired about getting Buckley's endorsement. Major political figures such as former President Bill Clinton, Republican Senator and 2008 presidential nominee John McCain and his former running mate Sarah Palin campaigned in Georgia, because of the election's potential to determine whether the Democratic Party could block filibusters in the United States Senate. Historically, run-off elections in Georgia have had significantly lower turnout than have general elections.

Chambliss's campaign verified that former Republican presidential candidates John McCain and Mike Huckabee would be campaigning in Georgia on the Senator's behalf, and former Democratic Governor and former U.S. Senator Zell Miller endorsed Chambliss. Former President Bill Clinton campaigned on Martin's behalf. Sarah Palin campaigned for the Chambliss campaign on December 1, the eve of the run-off election. President-elect Barack Obama had also been invited by the Democratic campaign but decided against making a stop.

The results of the runoff election were of particular interest to both parties. Subsequent to the November 4 general elections, Democrats had captured 58 seats in the Senate, two shy of a filibuster-proof supermajority.  The result of Georgia's runoff election, as well as the results of an extremely close race and recount in Minnesota, would determine whether or not the required majority of 60 seats would be met. Although the Democratic nominee lost the runoff, the party would still obtain a supermajority after Pennsylvania Senator Arlen Specter switched from the Republican party to the Democratic party in April 2009 and Democrat Al Franken won in Minnesota after several recounts in June 2009.

Polling

Results

See also 

 2008 United States Senate elections

References

External links 
 Elections Division from the Georgia Secretary of State
 U.S. Congress candidates for Georgia at Project Vote Smart
 Georgia, U.S.  Senate from CQ Politics
 Georgia U.S. Senate from OurCampaigns.com
 Georgia U.S. Senate race from 2008 Race Tracker
 Campaign contributions for Georgia congressional races from OpenSecrets
 Official campaign websites (Archived)
 Saxby Chambliss, Republican incumbent nominee
 Dale Cardwell, Democratic candidate
 Vernon Jones, Democratic candidate
 Rand Knight, Democratic candidate
 Josh Lanier, Democratic candidate
 Jim Martin, Democratic nominee
 Allen Buckley, Libertarian nominee

2008
Georgia
United States Senate